Pterolophia strumosa is a species of beetle in the family Cerambycidae. It was described by Francis Polkinghorne Pascoe in 1865, originally under the genus Praonetha. It is known from Australia. It contains the varietas Pterolophia strumosa var. blackburni.

References

strumosa
Beetles described in 1865